Vilsack is a surname. Notable people with the surname include:

Christie Vilsack (born 1950), American literacy advocate and politician
Norman A. Vilsack Frauenheim (1897 – 1989),  American pianist and music teacher
Tom Vilsack (born 1950), American politician and lawyer